Seulo (Seulu in sardinian language) is a comune (municipality) in the Province of South Sardinia in the Italian region Sardinia, located about  north of Cagliari.

It borders the following municipalities: Aritzo, Arzana, Gadoni, Sadali, Seui, Villanova Tulo.

Seulo holds the record of 20 centenarians from 1996 to 2016, making it the place where people live the longest in the world.

Demographic evolution

See also

Blue Zone

References

Cities and towns in Sardinia